Donát Laczkovich (born 19 April 1991) is a Hungarian football player who currently plays for Austrian club ASK Waldquelle Kobersdorf.

References

External links
Profile at HLSZ 

Donát Laczkovich at ÖFB

1991 births
Living people
Footballers from Budapest
Hungarian footballers
Hungarian expatriate footballers
Association football midfielders
FK Dukla Prague players
SK Kladno players
Paksi FC players
Soproni VSE players
Budaörsi SC footballers
Czech National Football League players
Nemzeti Bajnokság II players
Hungarian expatriate sportspeople in the Czech Republic
Hungarian expatriate sportspeople in Germany
Hungarian expatriate sportspeople in Austria
Expatriate footballers in the Czech Republic
Expatriate footballers in Germany
Expatriate footballers in Austria